Ajose is both a surname a given name. Notable people with the name include:

Surname:
Nicky Ajose (born 1991), English footballer
Oladele Ajose, Nigerian academic
Philip Hunsu Ajose (1932–2001), Nigerian religious leader

Given name:
Ajose Olusegun (born 1979), Nigerian-born British boxer

Masculine given names